The Cameron Files: Pharaoh's Curse (known in Europe as Amenophis: Resurrection) is an adventure video game released in 2002, developed by Galilea and published by DreamCatcher Interactive and The Adventure Company.

This game is set in Egypt in the year 1936 and the Pharaoh’s mummy, on display in the Cairo Museum of Antiquities, has mysteriously disappeared. Unravel the treacherous plot using your keen sense of observation and investigative skills. Solve puzzles and talk to interesting characters, some of whom could be suspects, in what may be a dark conspiracy laced with supernatural undertones. Search the Museum, travel down the River Nile and explore the Egyptian sands looking for key clues as to where the mummy has gone and why.

It is the second game in The Cameron Files series, following The Cameron Files: Secret at Loch Ness.

Reception 

The game received "mixed" reviews, more so than its predecessor, according to video game review aggregator Metacritic.

References

External links 
 

2002 video games
Adventure games
Detective video games
Video games developed in France
Windows games
Windows-only games
DreamCatcher Interactive games
The Adventure Company games
The Cameron Files